Michael Peter Desmond O'Donoghue  (born 1971) is a British officer of arms who currently serves as York Herald of Arms in Ordinary at the College of Arms in London. He was appointed to the office on 31 May 2012, having served as Bluemantle Pursuivant from 2005.

Life and career
The son of Michael John O'Donoghue (1934-2016), a lecturer in gemmology at the London Metropolitan University and a noted author of books on the subject, formerly a curator at the British Museum and the National Library of Scotland, and Elizabeth Anne Hawkins (née Borley), O'Donoghue was educated at Gonville and Caius College, Cambridge (M.A. 1991) where he was president of the Cambridge University Heraldic and Genealogical Society. For several years he was a genealogist and researcher, including time spent as research assistant to two Windsor Heralds—the late Theobald Mathew and William Hunt.

With Clive Cheesman (Richmond Herald), O'Donoghue was the co-editor of The Coat of Arms, the journal of the Heraldry Society. The two heralds took over that position in 2005 from the late John Brooke-Little, former Clarenceux King of Arms. He was elected a Fellow of the Society of Antiquaries in 2015.

In 2002, O'Donoghue married Catherine Ann Wolfe, Ph.D.

See also
Heraldry
Pursuivant

References

|-

|-

English genealogists
English officers of arms
1971 births
Living people
Place of birth missing (living people)
English male non-fiction writers